The 2019–20 Chinese Men's Volleyball Super League is the 24th season of the Chinese Men's Volleyball Super League, the highest professional volleyball league in China. Shanghai Golden Age are the defending champions.

The regular season was scheduled to begin on 19 January 2020 and ended with the Finals on 12 May 2020, but was postponed following the coronavirus pandemic. On 17 August 2020, Chinese Volleyball Association announce that the season would be resumed on 20 August 2020 in Qinhuangdao, a coastal city in eastern China, finishing on 2 September. The 14-day schedule is the shortest for this event in its history as the games are played in tournament style.

On 1 September 2020, Shanghai Golden Age won their 16th Chinese Men's Volleyball Super League title, after defeating Jiangsu Nanjing Radio and Television Maomao in the final, 2–0 (3–1, 3–0).

Clubs

Clubs and locations

Clubs Locations

Regular season

First stage

Group A

|}

|}

Group B

|}

|}

Group C

|}

|}

Group D

|}

|}

Second stage

Group E

|}

|}

Group F

|}

|}

Group G

|}

|}

Group H

|}

|}

Final stage

Bracket

Third stage

Fifth place play-offs

|}

Semifinals

|}

Fourth stage

Eleventh place match

|}

Ninth place match

|}

Seventh place match

|}

Fifth place match

|}

Third place match

|}

Final

|}

Final standing

References

External links 
 Official website of the Chinese Volleyball Association

League 2019-20
Chinese Volleyball Super League, 2019-20
Chinese Volleyball Super League, 2019-20
Volleyball League, 2019-20
Volleyball League, 2019-20